William O'Hara Martin (September 9, 1845 – September 14, 1901) was an American merchant and banker from Nevada who spent four years as a Republican member of the Nevada State Senate from Ormsby County (1877-1881) before moving to Reno.

He and wife Louise Stadtmuller Martin had seven children, of whom suffragist Anne Henrietta Martin was the second.

References 

1845 births
1901 deaths
American bankers
American merchants
Businesspeople from Nevada
Republican Party Nevada state senators
Politicians from Carson City, Nevada
19th-century American politicians
19th-century American businesspeople